The Canadian Association of University Teachers (CAUT; , ACPPU) is a federation of independent associations and trade unions representing approximately 70,000 teachers, librarians, researchers, and other academic professionals and general staff at 120 universities and colleges across Canada.

Principal aims

The principal objectives of CAUT, as defined in its general by-law, are the following:
 the defence of academic freedom, tenure, equality and human rights;
 the provision of collective bargaining services for the support and assistance of member associations;
 the conduct of federal lobbying and public relations for academic staff and post-secondary education;
 the collection and analysis of data and the operation of a clearing house for information pertaining to the social and economic well-being of academic staff and post-secondary education;
 the establishment and maintenance of international relations with academic staff in other countries.

History

In November 1949, the Association of Teaching Staff of the University of Alberta first began exploring the idea of creating a national association of faculty to deal with issues of "salaries and pensions, sabbatical leave and academic freedom."

A poll of professors across the country found strong support for the initiative.

When the Learned Societies, now Canadian Federation for the Humanities and Social Sciences, held their annual session in 1950 at the Royal Military College of Canada in Kingston, Ontario, an organizing committee was established and a decision was made to establish a national organization of university teachers. CAUT was founded on 6 June the following year.

Membership grew quickly. By 1957, CAUT represented about 78 per cent of Canadian university teachers with 26 member associations and 3,400 full-time faculty. However, the organization struggled financially. It continued to operate without a national office and was staffed entirely by volunteers.

In 1958, CAUT was confronted with one of the most prominent academic freedom cases in Canada. The Board of Regents of Winnipeg's United College, a Presbyterian institution that is today the University of Winnipeg, dismissed Professor Harry S. Crowe for a letter he wrote to a colleague. The letter, obtained by the Principal of the college, was critical of the administration and made disparaging comments about the religious influence over the institution. CAUT was asked to investigate the matter and appointed a committee that included V. C. Fowke of the University of Saskatchewan and Bora Laskin of the University of Toronto. In its final report, the committee concluded that Crowe's dismissal violated due process, natural justice, and academic freedom. The committee recommended that Crowe be reinstated. Following the release of the report, three of Crowe's colleagues stated they planned to resign unless Crowe was re-hired. The Board of Regents eventually agreed to reinstate Crowe, but refused to reconsider the three resignations. In protest, Crowe and 13 other professors left the college.

Even though Crowe and his colleagues lost their jobs, the case proved to be a seminal moment in CAUT's history. The time, effort, and expenditure demanded by the case demonstrated the need for a permanent office which was established in Ottawa in the fall of 1959. Stewart Reid, a colleague of Crowe's, was appointed the first secretary of CAUT. Reid oversaw the development of policy statements on governance, academic freedom and tenure, and throughout the 1960s CAUT focused much of its work on ensuring stronger protections for academic freedom.

In this early period, CAUT member associations were not trade unions. The unionization of Canadian academics did not begin until the 1970s. Pay and benefits had increased during the boom period of the 1960s when government funding increased and new universities and colleges were established. By the early 1970s, however, the tide had turned. The academic community was now facing a protracted period of restraint. Many academics argued that collective organizing was now needed to protect their pay and professional rights.

Academic staff associations in Quebec were the first to certify as trade unions beginning in 1971 with the Association des Ingenieurs Professeurs en Science Appliques de l'Université de Sherbrooke. By 1975, more than 60 per cent of academic staff in Quebec were unionized. In English Canada, 25 per cent of professors were union members. CAUT increasingly encouraged member associations to certify, and by 1980 over 50 per cent of faculty were unionized.

In recent years, CAUT's membership has grown as part-time and contract academic staff have been organized. In addition, provincial college faculty associations from British Columbia, Ontario, and Alberta have joined. Today, CAUT represents 86 associations with approximately 70,000 individual members.

Academic freedom

While collective bargaining occupies a much more central place in CAUT's operations today, the defence of academic freedom remains a core priority. According to the CAUT policy statement, the association defines academic freedom as follows:

Academic freedom includes the right, without restriction by prescribed doctrine, to freedom of teaching and discussion; freedom in carrying out research and disseminating and publishing the results thereof; freedom in producing and performing creative works; freedom to engage in service to the institution and the community; freedom to express freely one’s opinion about the institution, its administration, or the system in which one works; freedom from institutional censorship; freedom to acquire, preserve, and provide access to documentary material in all formats; and freedom to participate in professional and representative academic bodies.

CAUT continues to investigate cases of alleged violations of academic freedom as in the Crowe case.  Other notable investigations include the case of Nancy Olivieri, David Healy, and Tony Hall.

On 22 April 2021, CAUT censured the University of Toronto over its decision to terminate the candidacy of Valentina Azarova for the directorship of the international human rights program at the Faculty of Law.

Affiliations

CAUT is a member of Education International, a global federation of education workers' trade unions.

Twenty-five member associations of CAUT are also members of the National Union of the Canadian Association of University Teachers, a trade union affiliated to the Canadian Labour Congress.

Presidents

 1951–1952: F. A. Knox
 1952–1954: F. S. Howes
 1954–1956: V. C. Fowke
 1956–1958: H. W. McCready
 1958–1959: Clarence Barber
 1959–1960: Harold Good
 1960–1961: J. H. Aitchison
 1961–1962: A. Carrothers
 1962–1963: Emile Gosselin
 1963–1964: R. W. Torrens
 1964–1965: Bora Laskin
 1965–1966: Jacques St-Pierre
 1966–1967: Gideon Rosenbluth
 1967–1968: Howard McCurdy
 1968–1969: C. B. Macpherson
 1969–1970: Willard Allen
 1970–1971: Gordin Kaplan
 1971–1972: Robert Bertrand
 1972–1973: Charles C. Bigelow
 1973–1974: Evelyn Moore
 1974–1975: Richard Spencer
 1975–1976: David Braybrooke
 1976–1977: Jill Vickers
 1977–1978: Gordon Jones
 1979–1980: Roland Penner
 1980–1981: Israel Unger
 1981–1982: Jim Foulks
 1982–1983: Ken McGovern
 1983–1985: Sarah Shorten
 1985–1986: Ed Anderson
 1986–1987: Allan Sharp
 1987–1988: John Evans
 1988–1989: Peter King
 1989–1990: Pamela Smith
 1990–1991: Robert W. Kerr
 1991–1992: Fred Wilson
 1992–1994: Alan Andrews
 1994–1996: Joyce Lorimer
 1996–1998: William Bruneau
 1998–2000: William Graham
 2000–2002: Thomas Booth
 2002–2004: Victor M. Catano
 2004–2006: Loretta Czernis
 2006–2008: Greg Allain
 2008–2011: Penni Stewart
 2011–2014: Wayne Peters
 2014–2016: Robin Vose
 2016–2019: James Compton
 2019–2022: Brenda Austin-Smith
 2022–present: Peter McInnis

Archives 
There is a Canadian Association of University Teachers fond at Library and Archives Canada. The archival reference number is R7226, former archival reference number MG28-I208. The fond covers the date range 1951 to 2004. It consists of 115.65 meters of textual records, and a number of audio records and photographs.

The Archival papers of James B. Conacher, a founding member of CAUT, are held at the University of Toronto Archives and Records Management Services.

See also 

 Fair Employment Week

References

Footnotes

Bibliography

External links

CAUT Bulletin
CAUT Defence Fund
Harry Crowe Foundation
National Union of the Canadian Association of University Teachers

Trade unions in Canada
Tertiary education trade unions
Higher education in Canada
Trade unions established in 1951
1951 establishments in Canada